Come from Away is a 2021 American-Canadian musical film comprising a live stage recording of Irene Sankoff and David Hein's 2017 musical of the same name, which tells the true story of 7,000 airline passengers who were stranded in a small town in Newfoundland, where they were housed and welcomed, after the September 11, 2001 terrorist attacks. The film, produced in response to the shutdown of Broadway caused by the COVID-19 pandemic in the spring of 2020, was directed by Christopher Ashley and filmed in May 2021 at the Gerald Schoenfeld Theater in New York City, featuring members of the Broadway cast.

The film was released on Apple TV+ on September 10, 2021, a day before the 20th anniversary of the 9/11 attacks. It received highly positive reviews from critics.

Cast
 Petrina Bromley as Bonnie Harris and others
 Jenn Colella as Annette, Beverley Bass and others
 De'Lon Grant as Bob and others
 Joel Hatch as Claude Elliott and others
 Tony LePage as Garth, Kevin Tuerff and others
 Caesar Samayoa as Ali, Kevin Jung and others
 Q. Smith as Hannah O'Rourke and others
 Astrid Van Wieren as Beulah Davis and others
 Emily Walton as Janice Mosher and others
 Jim Walton as Doug, Nick Marson and others
 Sharon Wheatley as Diane Gray and others
 Paul Whitty as Oz Fudge and others

Production
In November 2017, it was announced that The Mark Gordon Company would produce a feature film adaptation of the musical, with Sankoff and Hein writing the screenplay and Christopher Ashley as director. In an April 2019 interview, Sankoff and Hein stated that the intention was to film in Gander and cast lesser-known actors, with residents of Gander as film extras.

On February 2, 2021, it was announced that due to the COVID-19 pandemic and its impacts on the film industry and the performing arts, the plans for the film adaptation were cancelled in favor of producing a live film recording of the stage production with the members of the Broadway cast reprising their roles, to be released in September 2021 on the 20th anniversary of the 9/11 attacks. It was produced and financed by Entertainment One and RadicalMedia and filmed in May 2021 at the Gerald Schoenfeld Theater with Ashley directing and Gordon still attached as producer. Joining the producing team are Jennifer Todd, Bill Condon and one of the stage production's producers, Junkyard Dog Productions. Sankoff, Hein, Jon Kamen, Dave Sirulnick and Meredith Bennett executive produce. The film employed 222 people including the members of the New York cast, crew, staff and creative and film teams. On April 30, 2021, Apple TV+ acquired the film's distribution rights.

Reception

Critical response
According to review aggregator website Rotten Tomatoes, 98% of 42 critics have given the film a positive review, with an average rating of 8.3/10. The critics consensus reads: "Come from Away sifts through the wreckage of tragedy to find hope -- and the healing power of human connection." On Metacritic, the film received a score of 83 out of 100 based on 9 critics, indicating "universal acclaim".

References

External links
 

2021 films
2021 drama films
2021 LGBT-related films
2020s musical drama films
American films based on actual events
American LGBT-related films
American musical drama films
Apple TV+ original films
Drama films based on actual events
2020s English-language films
Entertainment One films
Filmed stage productions
Films based on musicals
Films based on the September 11 attacks
Films set in a theatre
Films shot in New York City
Gander, Newfoundland and Labrador
Impact of the COVID-19 pandemic on the performing arts
LGBT-related musical drama films
Musical films based on actual events
Sung-through musical films
Films directed by Christopher Ashley
2020s American films